Attalea amygdalina is a species of palm endemic to Colombia.

References

Flora of Colombia
amygdalina